Cochylis serrana is a species of moth of the family Tortricidae. It is found in Minas Gerais, Brazil.

The wingspan is about 10.5 mm. The forewing ground colour is whitish with some indistinct brownish cream suffusions and brown strigulation (fine streaks). The markings are brownish with brown dots and strigulae. The hindwings are whitish with brownish strigulation and terminal suffusion.

Etymology
The species name refers to the type locality, Serra do Cipó.

References

Moths described in 2007
Cochylis